The serious Hotel Caledonien fire took place at the 12-story Hotel Caledonien in Kristiansand, Norway, on September 5, 1986.  The fire alarm was received at 04:40 in the morning. There were 14 fatalities, and more than 100 people were rescued. Rescue operations included a helicopter lifting persons off the roof and off upper story windows stories.

References

 Falck Ambulance Services 
 Official investigation (January 1987)
 NRK: Hotel Caledonien i brann (2 September 2011)
 SINTEF: Håndbok i Branntekniske Analyser og -Beregninger (Chap 6, av K. Opstad og J.P. Stensaas 1998)
 Norwegian magazine, Mott Brann July 1986

Fires in Norway
1986 in Norway
1986 fires in Europe
Hotel fires
September 1986 events in Europe